Giffard Cove is a cove 1 nautical mile (1.9 km) wide in the west side of Charlotte Bay, along the west coast of Graham Land. Charted by the Belgian Antarctic Expedition under Gerlache, 1897–99.  Named by the United Kingdom Antarctic Place-Names Committee (UK-APC) in 1960 for Henri Giffard (1825–1882), French engineer who constructed and flew the first truly navigable balloon (dirigible airship), in 1852.

References

Coves of Graham Land
Danco Coast